The 1992 St. Louis Cardinals season was the team's 111th season in St. Louis, Missouri and its 101st season in the National League. The Cardinals went 83-79 during the season and finished third in the National League East division, 13 games behind the NL East champion Pittsburgh Pirates.

Offseason
 November 25, 1991: Ken Hill was traded by the St. Louis Cardinals to the Montreal Expos for Andrés Galarraga.
 January 15, 1992: Ozzie Canseco signed as a free agent with the St. Louis Cardinals.

Regular season
Starting pitcher Bob Tewksbury posted his best season with a 2.16 ERA, second-best in the NL, and topped the league walks per nine innings and strikeout-to-walk ratio.  He finished third in the Cy Young voting.  Catcher Tom Pagnozzi posted the sixteenth best single-season fielding mark (tied) in history for his position (.9987).

The team led the National League in batting average at .262 but was just sixth in runs scored.  Their 3.38 ERA was fourth in the league.

Season standings

Record vs. opponents

Notable transactions

Roster

Player stats

Batting

Starters by position
Note: Pos = Position; G = Games played; AB = At bats; H = Hits; Avg. = Batting average; HR = Home runs; RBI = Runs batted in

Other batters
Note: G = Games played; AB = At bats; H = Hits; Avg. = Batting average; HR = Home runs; RBI = Runs batted in

Pitching

Starting pitchers 
Note: G = Games pitched; IP = Innings pitched; W = Wins; L = Losses; ERA = Earned run average; SO = Strikeouts

Other pitchers 
Note: G = Games pitched; IP = Innings pitched; W = Wins; L = Losses; ERA = Earned run average; SO = Strikeouts

Relief pitchers 
Note: G = Games pitched; W = Wins; L = Losses; SV = Saves; ERA = Earned run average; SO = Strikeouts

Awards and honors
  Cardinals team records:  Errorless streak (16 games) and fielding percentage (.985).
  Ozzie Smith:  Gold Glove at SS
  Tom Pagnozzi:  Gold Glove at C

Farm system

References

External links 
1992 St. Louis Cardinals at Baseball Reference
1992 St. Louis Cardinals team page at www.baseball-almanac.com

St. Louis Cardinals seasons
Saint Louis Cardinals season
St Lou